Dalıqaya (also, Dəli-qaya, Dəliqaya, and Dalikaya) is a village in the Quba Rayon of Azerbaijan.  The village forms part of the municipality of Zıxır.

References

External links

Populated places in Quba District (Azerbaijan)